The boxing competition at the 2018 Central American and Caribbean Games was held in Barranquilla, Colombia from 25 July to 2 August at the Salon Jumbo del Country Club.

Medal summary

Men's events

Women's events

Medal table

References

External links
2018 Central American and Caribbean Games – Boxing

2018 Central American and Caribbean Games events
Central American and Caribbean Games
2018